Pierre Corbeil, D.M.D. (born June 23, 1955 in Saint-Hyacinthe, Quebec) is a Quebec politician and dentist. He was the mayor of Val-d'Or, Quebec from 2013 to 2021. He was also a Member of National Assembly of Quebec (MNA) for Abitibi-Est as a member of the Quebec Liberal Party and served as a cabinet minister in the government of Jean Charest.

Corbeil went to the Université de Montréal and obtained a doctor's degree in dentistry in 1978 before becoming an associate at a local dental clinic. He would later become the manager and vice-president of the Quebec Association of Dental Surgeons. He would also be the president of the Val-d'Or Chamber of Commerce, a municipal councillor in Val-d'Or for nearly ten years and president of a local hockey league.

Corbeil jumped into provincial politics in 2003 when he was elected as MNA for Abitibi-Est as the Liberals under the leadership of Jean Charest. He would become the Minister of Forest, Wildlife and Parks in 2003 and during a cabinet shuffle in 2005 would become Minister of Natural Resources and Wildlife.

His term was marked by several closures of plants and sawmills in the lumber sector, including Domtar, which cost several hundred jobs for regions such as the Outaouais, Nord-du-Québec and Abitibi-Témiscamingue. Restructuring plans were tabled by the Minister in order to re-launch the economy of several towns affected by the closures due to the softwood lumber dispute.

Corbeil was defeated in the 2007 election by the Parti Québécois's aboriginal candidate Alexis Wawanoloath. He was re-elected in the 2008 election and named the minister responsible for Indian Affairs which was previously held by Benoit Pelletier who did not seek re-election.

External links
 

1955 births
Canadian dentists
French Quebecers
Living people
Members of the Executive Council of Quebec
People from Saint-Hyacinthe
People from Val-d'Or
Quebec Liberal Party MNAs
Quebec municipal councillors
Université de Montréal alumni
21st-century Canadian politicians
Mayors of places in Quebec